The videography of South Korean group iKon consists of 15 music videos, 5 concert tour videos and 3 music video compilation. The group sold over 40,000 physical DVD/Blu-ray in Japan as a group.

Video albums

Concert tour videos

Other releases

Music videos

See also
 iKon discography

References

Videography
Videographies of South Korean artists